Coleophora hamata is a moth of the family Coleophoridae. It is found in Mongolia.

References

hamata
Moths of Asia